Hana Mareghni (sometimes spelled Marghani or Mergheni; born 4 May 1989 in Tunis) is a Tunisian judoka. She competed at the 2012 Summer Olympics in the -78 kg event and lost her match to Mayra Aguiar.

At the 2011 All-Africa Games, Hana won a gold medal.

References

External links
 

1989 births
Living people
Tunisian female judoka
Olympic judoka of Tunisia
Judoka at the 2012 Summer Olympics
Sportspeople from Tunis
African Games gold medalists for Tunisia
African Games medalists in judo
Competitors at the 2011 All-Africa Games
21st-century Tunisian women
20th-century Tunisian women